Hugolín Gavlovič (born as Martin Gavlovič) (11 November 1712, Czarny Dunajec – 4 June 1787, Horovce) was a Slovak Franciscan priest who authored religious, moral, and educational writings in the contemporary West Slovak vernacular, and was a prominent representative of baroque literature in Slovakia. 

He wrote didactical-reflexive poetry. His works are written in a West Slovak vernacular which "is situated temporally as well as linguistically between the systems described by Pavel Doležal and by Anton Bernolák" (Ďurovič "The Language of Walaska Sskola" 659). His most famous piece of work is Valašská škola, mravúv stodola (originally published under the name Walaska Sskola Mrawuw Stodola), a work of 17,862 verses, nearly all in fourteen syllables, as well as numerous versified couplet-marginalia.

References
 Sabo, Gerald J.: Hugolín Gavlovič’s Valaská Škola. - Columbus, OH, 1988, 730 p.

External links 
  Zlatý fond SME - Hugolín Gavlovič
  Obec Pruské - Osobnosti - Hugolín Gavlovič
 

1712 births
1787 deaths
18th-century Slovak people
18th-century poets
Slovak poets
Slovak Roman Catholic priests
People from Nowy Targ County